Oregon Route 22 is an Oregon state highway that runs between the Oregon Coast community of Hebo, to an interchange with U.S. Route 20 near Santiam Pass in the Cascade Mountains. OR 22 traverses several highways of the Oregon state highway system, including the Three Rivers Highway No. 32, part of the Salmon River Highway No. 39, the Willamina–Salem Highway No. 30, part of the Salem Highway No. 72, and the North Santiam Highway No. 162.

Route description

Three Rivers Highway 
Oregon Route 22 begins (at its western terminus) at a junction with U.S. Route 101 in the coastal town of Hebo. The first section, known as the Three Rivers Highway No. 32, is a mostly scenic route; however, it is narrow and winding, and not well-suited for high-volume traffic. Little or no shoulder with an abrupt dropoff, few guardrails, no lighting, lack of adequate warning signs, and neglected paint lines in some areas, contribute to the treacherous conditions. Drivers may encounter logging trucks in the narrow two-lane road as well After passing Dolph Junction, OR 22 winds eastward though the coast range along Sourgrass Creek, a tributary of the Little Nestucca River, until it reaches the community of Grand Ronde. There, it joins with Oregon Route 18 at a location known as Valley Junction, and overlaps OR 18 along part of the Salmon River Highway No. 39 in an approximately  stretch between Grand Ronde and Willamina, at which point OR 22 heads southeast towards Salem, while OR 18 goes northeast towards the Portland area. The portion from Hebo to Grand Ronde was formerly signed as OR 14.

Willamina-Salem Highway 

The stretch between Willamina and Salem is known as the Willamina-Salem Highway No. 30. Between Willamina and Dallas, it is a mostly two-lane highway; unlike the stretch between Hebo and Grand Ronde, this part of OR 22 is a major freight corridor. In the Dallas/Rickreall area are intersections with Oregon Route 223 and Oregon Route 99W, along with a spur route of OR 223 further to the west. East of the OR 223 interchange, OR 22 is an expressway into Salem; there is a project being planned to upgrade much of this stretch of OR 22 to freeway standards. Between Dallas and Salem, OR 22 intersects two other highways: Oregon Route 51 and Oregon Route 221. Immediately beyond the interchange with OR 221 is the Marion Street Bridge across the Willamette River, and downtown Salem.

Salem area 
After crossing the bridge, OR 22 (along with OR 99E Business, which it joins) heads south along Front Street for a few blocks, then east past Willamette University. At the eastern edge of the Willamette campus, an interchange carries the highway to Mission Street; OR 22 and OR 99E Business continue east on Mission Street (which is really an urban expressway), past the Salem airport to an interchange with Interstate 5 and Oregon Route 99E. OR 99E Business ends here; OR 22 continues to the east. This portion of OR 22 is part of the Salem Highway No. 72.

North Santiam Highway 
East of the I-5 interchange, OR 22 is known as the North Santiam Highway No. 162. This section of OR 22 is a major transportation corridor; and is a primary route between Salem and the central Willamette Valley, and Central Oregon. Between I-5 and Stayton; OR 22 is a freeway: a four-lane undivided freeway between I-5 and Aumsville; a traditional divided freeway between Aumsville and Stayton, and a two-lane freeway in the Stayton/Sublimity area. The highway continues east, along the northern bank of the Santiam River, through the community of Mehama and the cities of Mill City, Gates, and Detroit. The highway passes numerous hydroelectric dams, including the ruins of an early 20th-century dam at Niagara County Park and the mid-20th century Detroit Dam which forms much-visited Detroit Lake. Beyond the Detroit on the east end of the reservoir, the highway passes Idanha, and turns south, west of Mount Jefferson, passes Marion Forks, and reaches its terminus at an interchange with U.S. Route 20 and Oregon Route 126 at Santiam Junction. US 20 and OR 126 continue east over Santiam Pass into central Oregon; US 20 heads to Bend and OR 126 to Redmond.

Major intersections

References

External links
 Project website for proposed expansion in Grand Ronde area
 ORoads: Oregon Highway 22

022
Transportation in Tillamook County, Oregon
Transportation in Yamhill County, Oregon
Transportation in Marion County, Oregon
Transportation in Linn County, Oregon
Transportation in Polk County, Oregon